This partial list of city nicknames in New Jersey compiles the aliases, sobriquets and slogans that cities, other municipalities, and other populated places in New Jersey are known by (or have been known by historically), officially and unofficially, to municipal governments, local people, outsiders or their tourism boards or chambers of commerce. City nicknames can help in establishing a civic identity, helping outsiders recognize a community or attracting people to a community because of its nickname; promote civic pride; and build community unity. Nicknames and slogans that successfully create a new community "ideology or myth" are also believed to have economic value. Their economic value is difficult to measure, but there are anecdotal reports of cities that have achieved substantial economic benefits by "branding" themselves by adopting new slogans.

Some unofficial nicknames are positive, while others are derisive. The unofficial nicknames listed here have been in use for a long time or have gained wide currency.
 Asbury Park – The Dark City
Atlantic City – A.C., America's Playground
Belleville – The Cherry Blossom Capital of America
Byram Township – The Township of Lakes
Caldwell – The Denver of the East
Carlstadt, New Jersey -– Home of the Nations First Kindergarten 
Cranford – The Venice of New Jersey
Denville – Hub of Morris County
East Orange – Illtown
Elizabeth – Eastwick
Fair Lawn – The Lawn
Fort Lee – The Birthplace of the Motion Picture Industry
Fortescue – Weakfish Capital of the World
Franklin – Fluorescent Mineral Capital of the World
Garwood – The Industrial Center of Union County
Hackensack – A City in Motion
Hammonton – Blueberry Capital of the World
Hasbrouck Heights – Hasbro Nation
Hoboken – The Mile Square City
Irvington – Ghost Town, Formerly known as Camptown
Jersey City – America's Golden Door, Chilltown, Wall Street West, The Sixth Borough
Keansburg – The Burg, Gem of the Bayshore
Lambertville – Antique Capital of New Jersey
Long Beach Island – L.B.I.
Long Branch – America's First Seaside Resort, The Friendly City
Madison – The Rose City
Maplewood – MapSo (in reference to the town's close/symbiotic relationship with neighboring town, South Orange)
Metuchen – The Brainy Boro
Millville – The Holly City
Morristown – Motown, The Military Capital of the American Revolution
Mount Laurel – Hotel Land
Neptune Township – The Crossroads of the Jersey Shore
New Brunswick – Health Care City, Hub City
Newark – Brick City, Gateway City, Renaissance Newark 
North Arlington – Where Bergen County Begins 
Ocean City – America's Greatest Family Resort, A Moral Seaside Resort (historic slogan from the 19th century)
Paterson – Silk City
Perth Amboy – City by the Bay
Plainfield – Queen City
Pleasantville – P-Ville
Rutherford – Borough of Trees, The First Borough of Bergen County
Seaside Heights – Sleazeside

South Orange – SoMa (in reference to the township's close/symbiotic relationship with neighboring town, Maplewood)
Spring Lake – The Irish Riviera
Trenton – Capital City, The Town
Tuckerton – Clamtown
Union City – Embroidery Capital of the United States,Union City 2000 Calendar; 2000; culled from History of West Hoboken and Union Hill by Ella-Mary Ryman; 1965 and "The Historical Background of Union City" by Daniel A. Primont, William G. Fiedler and Fred Zuccaro; 1964 Havana on the HudsonRosero, Jessica. "Most liquor licenses? Bumpiest town? Local municipalities hold unusual distinctions", Hudson Reporter, August 27, 2006. Accessed June 25, 2007. "At one time, Union City had its own claim to fame as being the second largest Cuban community in the nation, after Miami. During the wave of immigrant exiles of the 1960s, the Cuban population that did not settle in Miami's Little Havana found its way to the north in Union City. However, throughout the years, the growing Cuban community has spread out to other regions of North Hudson."
Vineland – Dandelion Capital of the World

See also
List of city nicknames in the United States
List of municipalities in New Jersey (by population)

References

External links
a list of American and a few Canadian nicknames
U.S. cities list

New Jersey
Populated places in New Jersey
New Jersey culture